Larysa is a given name. Notable people with the surname include:

 Larysa Artiugina (born 1971), Ukrainian documentary film director and activist
 Larysa Berezhna (born 1961), Ukrainian long jumper
 Larysa Harapyn, Canadian media personality
 Larysa Hienijuš (1910–1983), Belarusian poet, writer and active participant of the national movement
 Larysa Karlova (born 1958), Ukrainian handball player
 Larysa Khorolets (born 1948), Ukrainian actress
 Larysa Klochkova, Ukrainian Paralympic volleyball player
 Larysa Kondracki, Canadian producer, director and screenwriter
 Larysa Kuzmenko (born 1956), Canadian composer and pianist
 Larysa Ponomarenko, Ukrainian Paralympic volleyball player
 Larysa Sinchuk (born 1965), Ukrainian Paralympic volleyball player
 Larysa Varona (born 1983), Belarusian female cross-country skier, biathlete and rower
 Larysa Zaspa (born 1971), Ukrainian handball goalkeeper